The following lists events that happened during 2000 in Cape Verde.

Incumbents
President: António Mascarenhas Monteiro
Prime Minister: 
Carlos Veiga
Gualberto do Rosário

Events
Cape Verde ratified two UN protocols, the First Optional Protocol to the International Covenant on Civil and Political Rights and the Second Optional Protocol to the International Covenant on Civil and Political Rights, aiming at the abolition of the death penalty
February: Museu da Tabanka opened in the center of Assomada
June 16 census: Population: 428,079
July 30: Prime Minister Carlos Veiga resigns, Gualberto do Rosário becomes acting Prime Minister

Sports
Winter: the Boa Vista Opening Tournament held its first edition
Winter: the Fogo Opening Tournament held its first edition
Winter: the Sal Island Super Cup held its first edition
May 4-14: The 2000 Amílcar Cabral Cup was held in Praia
FC Derby won the Cape Verdean Football Championship

Births
January 3: Kenny Rocha Santos, footballer

References

 
Years of the 20th century in Cape Verde
Years of the 21st century in Cape Verde
2000s in Cape Verde
Cape Verde
Cape Verde